Menaldo is a surname of Hispanic origin. Notable people with the surname include:

Kévin Menaldo (born 1992), French pole vaulter
Luis Francisco Ortega Menaldo (born 1943), Guatemalan intelligence official

See also
Renaldo

Spanish-language surnames